Omiostola basiramula is a species of moth of the family Tortricidae. It is found in Colombia.

The wingspan is about 24 mm for males and 26 mm for females. The forewings are brown, mixed with whitish grey along the median cell and towards the tornus. The apex is browner with a slight purple hue. The hindwings are brown.

Etymology
The species name refers to the presence of a dark forewing marking and is derived from Greek basis (meaning the base) and Latin ramula (meaning a small branch).

References

	

Moths described in 2011
Olethreutini
Taxa named by Józef Razowski